Kunhing (Kunhein) is located in Kunhing Township in the middle part of southern Shan state, Myanmar. The name Kunhein refers to "a thousand island" in the local Shan language.

Geographic 
Kunhing is located by the Nam Pang River, an important tributary of the Salween.

Population 
As refers to 1983 census figures, it has less than 30,000 population; primarily Shans. Minorities are Akar, Lisu and Palaung.

Places of interest 
It is one of the main bridges on the Taunggyi-Kengtung Road.

References

Populated places in Shan State
Township capitals of Myanmar